Laxmi Narayan Mehta is a member of the current Bihar Legislative Assembly from Bihar, India.  He is from the Bharatiya Janata Party (BJP) and represents the Forbesganj Assembly seat.

References
 Members of Legislation Assembly. Governmental Portal of Bijar. Accessed 2011-01-30.

Bharatiya Janata Party politicians from Bihar
Year of birth missing (living people)
Living people
Members of the Bihar Legislative Assembly
People from Araria district